= Warriors of the Turkish People's Liberation Front =

The Warriors of the Turkish People's Liberation Front or WTPLF was a Turkish militant organization led by Omer Faruk Aydin.

On December 17, 1980, the leader of the group and five other members were arrested for involvement in 35 political murders in three years, also including the killing of a US serviceman on May 11, 1979.

Later on January 7, 1981, four more members were arrested in the province of Antalya for the killing of a US sergeant which took place on April 12, 1979.
